Furzehill may refer to the following places in England:

Furze Hill SSSI, a Site of Special Scientific Interest in Cambridgeshire
Furzehill, Devon, a hamlet in Devon
Furzehill, Dorset, a location
Furze Hill, a hamlet in Hampshire
Furzehills, a hamlet in Lincolnshire

See also 
Furzehill Plantation, in Devon
Furzehill Wood, in Dorset